Patricia Mangan (born March 7, 1997) is an American alpine skier. She competed in the women's giant slalom at the 2018 Winter Olympics.

She competed for the United States at the 2022 Winter Olympics.

References

External links
 

1997 births
Living people
American female alpine skiers
Olympic alpine skiers of the United States
Alpine skiers at the 2018 Winter Olympics
Alpine skiers at the 2022 Winter Olympics
Sportspeople from Buffalo, New York
21st-century American women